The Lanyu Lighthouse is a lighthouse in Orchid Island, Taitung County, Taiwan.

History
The lighthouse was built in 1982.

Architecture
The lighthouse emits four white flashes every 24 seconds with a luminous intensity of 1.2 million candlepower and nominal range of 25.1 nautical miles. This concrete lighthouse tower stands at 15 meters with lantern and gallery. It is painted in white for its all and black for its dome.

See also

 List of lighthouses in Taiwan
 List of tourist attractions in Taiwan

References

External links

 Maritime and Port Bureau MOTC

1982 establishments in Taiwan
Lighthouses in Taitung County
Lighthouses completed in 1982